Washee Ironee is a 1934 Our Gang short comedy film directed by James Parrott.  It was the 131st Our Gang short (43rd talking episode) that was released.

Plot
On the day that he is scheduled to perform a violin solo at a swank bridge luncheon held by his social-climbing mother, rich kid Waldo opts instead to play football with the gang. With Waldo's help, the kids win the game, but his expensive clothes are covered with mud. Spanky declares that he and his pals are perfectly capable of washing Wally's duds on their own—and the result is a slapstick smorgasbord, culminating in a typically outsized Hal Roach traffic jam.

Notes
Washee Ironee was directed by James Parrott, who directed many Laurel and Hardy shorts.
It was Wally Albright's last episode. Wally left the gang on his own and to the dismay of Hal Roach, to return to normal life. He had served for a short time but got many lead roles, including one on this episode.
It was also Billie Thomas' third episode but not yet as Buckwheat. (Buckwheat was originally a female character, portrayed by Carlena Beard and Willie Mae Taylor, who would morph into a boy by mid 1935.) Billie would appear in every succeeding Our Gang Hal Roach episode with the exception of Feed 'em and Weep in 1938. He also would appear in all 52 MGM Our Gang episodes until the series ended in 1944.
This is also Tommy Bond's last episode for his first tenure with Our Gang. Bond returned two and a half years later as a recurring bully named Butch.
When Spanky attempts to speak to the Asian Boy, he says "Ou-yay ash-way othes-clay" which is one of the first filmed uses of Pig Latin.
This was edited by about five minutes on the syndicated Little Rascals television package beginning in 1971 due to stereotyping of African Americans and Asians. Only a few parts of the scenes were inserted back into the film when it aired on AMC.
Also the film had no background music except for opening and closing titles but according to the book, Little Rascals the Life & Times of Our Gang, this was an oversight and Gus Meins meant to employ musical scoring on this episode which did not have as much dialogue as other films of the time.

Cast

The Gang
 Wally Albright as Waldo/ Wally
 Matthew Beard as Stymie
 Scotty Beckett as Scotty
 Tommy Bond as Tommy
 George McFarland as Spanky
 Alvin Buckelew as Alvin
 Leonard Kibrick as Leonard
 Jerry Tucker as Jerry
 Pete the Pup as Himself

Additional cast
 Jackie Lynn Taylor as Jane
 Harry Lowe Jr. as Kid from Laundromat
 Tommy McFarland as Game spectator
 Billie Thomas as Game spectator
 Jackie White as Little girl
 John Collum as Football player
 Dickie Jones as Football player
 Hal Law Jr. as Football player
 Joe Levine as Football player
 Gene Reynolds as Football player
 Billy Lee Wolfstone as Football player
 Sam Adams as Butler
 Ernie Alexander as Pedestrian
 Gertrude Astor as Maid of Olympia
 Symona Boniface as Maid of Olympia
 Lester Dorr as Pedestrian
 Billy Gilbert as Sneeze dub (voice)
 Julia Griffith as Maid of Olympia
 James C. Morton as Policeman
 James Parrott as Man walking by laundry
 Tiny Sandford as Policeman directing traffic
 Ellinor Vanderveer as Waldo's mother
 Joe the Monkey as Monkey
 Tony Kales as Unconfirmed

See also
 Our Gang filmography

References

External links

1934 films
American black-and-white films
1934 comedy films
Films directed by James Parrott
Hal Roach Studios short films
Our Gang films
1934 short films
1930s American films